Krit (also KRIT) may refer to:

People

Given name
 Krit Srivara (General Kris Sivara) (1914–1976), Thai military officer
 Krit Ratanarak, Thai businessman
 Chakrit Yamnam, Thai actor, also called Krit

Surname
 Christina Krit (born 1976), Russian musician

Stage name
 Big K.R.I.T. (born 1986), American musician

Other uses
 K-R-I-T Motor Car Company, an automobile manufacturing company
 KRIT (FM), an American radio station licensed to Parker, Arizona

See also
 
 Qrız (also Krits), a village and municipality in the Quba Rayon of Azerbaijan